Salvatore Calabrese (Campi Salentina, 6 January 1903 – Bologna 30 November 1973) was an Italian physician, scholar of Anatomical pathology and specialized in Gastroenterology. He promoted the construction of the Hospital Padre Pio da Pietrelcina in Campi Salentina. He is also the founder of the orphanage and homeless shelter “Mamma Bella”.

Biography
Salvatore Calabrese was born on 6 January 1903 in Campi Salentina (Lecce). In 1928 he graduated in Medicine and Surgery at the University of Naples Federico II. After that he moved to Genoa where he worked as volunteer assistant in the department of internal medicine at the Civil Hospital; then he became the medical director of the industrial company “Ansaldo”. During this period he dedicated his studies to Anatomical pathology and he also wrote various and popular scientific publications. In 1939 he specialized in Gastroenterology at the University of Pavia. During the Second World War he took part in the Italian Resistance against the fascists and he also participated in military operations for the liberation of Genova. In 1945 Calabrese came back to Campi Salentina where he founded the orphanage and homeless shelter “Mamma Bella”, dedicated to his three sons died prematurely. Five years later he gave impetus to the foundation of the Hospital Padre Pio da Pietrelcina, where he became medical director in 1951. He died in Bologna on 30 November 1973 after a myocardial infarction.

Sources

References

External links 
  Monuments and memories of Salvatore Calabrese in Himetop - The History of Medicine Topographical Database

1903 births
1973 deaths
Italian pathologists
University of Naples Federico II alumni
Founders of orphanages
Italian resistance movement members
20th-century Italian physicians
People from Lecce
Italian gastroenterologists
University of Pavia alumni